Moustapha Name (born 5 May 1995) is a Senegalese professional footballer who plays as a midfielder for Cypriot First Division club Pafos and the Senegal national team.

Club career

AS Douanes 
Moustapha Name started his career at AS Douanes in his native Senegal in 2016. During the 2017–18 season, he scored ten goals in the Senegal Premier League.

Pau 
In 2018, Name joined Pau and adapted quickly to French football in the Béarnese capital. In his second season, he occasionally captained the team.

In the 2019–20 Coupe de France, Pau reached the round of 16 and lost to a Paris Saint-Germain (PSG) side that went on to win the entire competition. The 2019–20 season was very successful for both Name and Pau; Pau achieved promoted to Ligue 2, and Name's displays against Ligue 1 heavyweights Bordeaux and PSG in the Coupe de France helped him make a name for himself.

Paris FC 
On 27 June 2020, Name signed with Paris FC after successful seasons with Pau in the Championnat National. He made his professional debut with Paris FC in a 3–0 Ligue 2 win over Chambly on 22 August 2020.

International career
Name debuted with the Senegal national team in a 2–0 2021 Africa Cup of Nations qualification win over Guinea Bissau on 11 November 2020.

Career statistics

Club

Honours
Senegal
Africa Cup of Nations: 2021

References

External links
 

1995 births
Living people
Footballers from Dakar
Senegalese footballers
Association football midfielders
Senegal international footballers
Senegal Premier League players
Championnat National players
Ligue 2 players
Cypriot First Division players
AS Douanes (Senegal) players
Paris FC players
Pau FC players
Pafos FC players
2021 Africa Cup of Nations players
2022 FIFA World Cup players
Africa Cup of Nations-winning players
Senegalese expatriate footballers
Senegalese expatriate sportspeople in France
Expatriate footballers in France
Senegalese expatriate sportspeople in Cyprus
Expatriate footballers in Cyprus